The 2006 Karjala Tournament was an ice hockey tournament that took place from November 9-12, 2006. Five games were played in Finland and one was played in the Czech Republic. Russia won the tournament before the Czech Republic and Sweden, while Finland finished fourth.

The tournament was part of the 2006-07 Euro Hockey Tour.

Final standings

Results

Best players 
The tournament directorate named the following players in the tournament 2006:

 Best goaltender:  Sinuhe Wallinheimo
 Best defenceman:  Magnus Johansson
 Best forward:  Petr Schastlivy

References

External links 
Tournament on hockeyarchives.info

2006–07 Euro Hockey Tour
2006–07 in Swedish ice hockey
2006–07 in Russian ice hockey
2006–07 in Finnish ice hockey
2006–07 in Czech ice hockey
2006
2006
November 2006 sports events in Europe
2000s in Helsinki
Sports competitions in Prague
2000s in Prague